Rudy Cisneros (born  August 9, 1981) is a professional boxer, and was a contestant on the ESPN reality show "Contender Season 2".  He is also studying architecture at Northern Michigan University.

He became a professional at age 22, after a stellar amateur career.  Cisneros won the 1997 Chicago C.Y.O. Jr. Middleweight Championship, winning a split decision over Matthew Podgorski.  He was a 1999 Chicago Golden Gloves Open division runner-up, as he lost a close bout to Jimmy Gonzalez in the 147 lb. division, and won the 2000 Chicago Golden Gloves Open division 156 lb. Title, by beating David Estrada.  He boxed internationally in 1997, with several wins in Ireland.  In addition, he won a bronze medal in the 2004 US Olympic trials.

On the show "Contender Season 2", Cisneros was a member of the Gold Team.  He fought in the second contest of the first round, having been chosen to face Norberto Bravo by the Blue Team, due to Cisneros' problems making weight for the upcoming bout.  Bravo won a split decision, with judge Max DeLuca scoring 49-46 Bravo, judge Lou Moret scoring 48-47 Cisneros, and judge Fritz Warner scoring 49-46 Bravo.

On May 13, 2011, former Puerto Rican Olympist Jonathan González outboxed and systematically broke Cisneros' will, forcing his corner to surrender the contest when he was helplessly pinned against the ropes receiving body punches.  On May 5, 2012 Cisneros was stopped in the first round by former amateur world champion and olympian, Demetrius Andrade.

External links
 

1981 births
Living people
American boxers of Mexican descent
Northern Michigan University alumni
The Contender (TV series) participants
American male boxers
Middleweight boxers